(born 10 April 1974, Aichi) is a Japanese professional drifting driver, currently competing in the D1 Grand Prix series for Shibata Racing Team.

Like many of the drivers in the D1 Grand Prix, he is the owner of his own tuning shop called SunRise, and works on his car himself. Before starting in D1GP, he was part of a team called, "Dropout Racing". He is quite a popular driver as he is one of the best drivers of the Toyota AE86 chassis in the D1GP today. He began competing in the D1GP in the sixth round in 2002, though he did not get any recognition until round 3 of 2004 when out of nowhere he defeated many well known names to take second place, and first exhibited his jumping drift which took the crowd and judges by storm.

He has always drove the Toyota Corolla Levin since he began and the combination of its light weight and his aggressive driving style make him a formidable opponent. As he carried on in D1GP, he has another Levin which is a 3-door while his N.A. Cream-Beige Levin AE86 is a 2-door coupe. The 3-door Levin is heavily modified, featuring the SR20 engine from a Nissan Silvia which gives a significant performance advantage over the standard engine. Though some of the more hardcore AE86 fans do not like this Nissan transplant, it is fairly common, but he has stuck with the stock AE86 live-axle rear end as some would use a S13 rear end.

In 2007, when he advanced to the finals in the Suzuka round, he purposely swerved into Masao Suenaga's path during the start of their first run and the judges originally placed him as 2nd but he was later disqualified after the tournament finished. He had a decent season but placed 11th overall.

In 2009, he changed to DRoo-P's AE85 which Toshiki Yoshioka had driven until the mid of 2008 for the newly built DRoo-P SC430. The AE85 was heavily changed with a new exterior design and a matte black. 
He earned his first win at Rd.3 in Okayama alongside Daigo Saito. He placed 5th overall in the series ranking.

In 2010, he picked up the sponsorship with UPGARAGE in collaboration with his main sponsor DRoo-P, which also required the change of his livery to grey and yellow. He earned his 2nd win Rd.5 in Ebisu going against Ken Nomura in the finals. Some would say it was considered a revenge match as Nomura had won at Rd.3 in Ebisu for the 2004 season. He also started to enter Drift Muscle races started by Keiichi Tsuchiya from 2011. He drives the Nissan Silvia S15 instead of the AE86 in the Drift Muscle series.

In 2012, he changed cars from the AE86 to the newer Toyota 86 from AE86. As Dunlop had dropped out of the series, he automatically changed tire sponsors with Falken.

In 2013, he earned his third win at Rd.5 in Huis Ten Bosch. This was also the first victory for a Toyota 86 in the series

At 2015, he started to drive Toyota Supra and changed to Zestino Tyre. He entered RDS in Russia and won all championship during this year. He also won championship D1 PRIMRING GP in Russia.
Hibino's result was 2nd place at D1GP Rd.6 and D1GP WORLD CHAMPIONS.
He started to join drift race in China from 2015. His D1GP series ranking was 6th place this year.

Hibino became member of GULF RACING ZESTINO TIRE from 2017. He changed his car to Honda S2000.
Hibino won TANSO Championship at 2017 D1GP TSUKUBA DRIFT Rd.3, D1GP China in Hefei and  D1 PRIMRING GP in Russia.

From 2019, he changed his car to Nissan Silvia (S14). The front of this car is designed to look like a Plymouth Barracuda by Rocket Bunny parts.

Complete Drifting Results

D1 Grand Prix

Russian Drift Series GP

Sources
 Tetsuya Official Site「hibinotetsuya.com」
 Hibino Tetsuya Channel［YouTube］  
 TEAM ZESTINO RACING
 D1 Grand Prix Official Japanese Site
 RDS GP

Japanese racing drivers
Drifting drivers
1974 births
Living people
D1 Grand Prix drivers